Neofidia clematis is a species of leaf beetle. It is known from southernmost Texas to central Veracruz, Mexico, east of the Sierra Madre Oriental. It was first described by the American entomologist Charles Frederic August Schaeffer in 1904. Two series of this species from Texas were collected from Cissus incisa, a species in the grape family (Vitaceae).

References

Further reading

 
 
 
 
 
 

Eumolpinae
Articles created by Qbugbot
Beetles described in 1904
Beetles of North America
Taxa named by Charles Frederic August Schaeffer